Blastobasis byrsodepta is a moth in the family Blastobasidae. It is found in South Africa and the Democratic Republic of Congo.

The length of the forewings is 6–7 mm. The forewings are greyish brown, the scales tipped with white intermixed with pale greyish brown scales tipped with white and brown scales. The hindwings are pale greyish brown, gradually darkening towards the apex.

The larvae have been recorded feeding on Ficus species.

References

Moths described in 1913
Blastobasis
Moths of Africa